A battery storage power station is a type of energy storage power station that uses a group of batteries to store electrical energy. Battery storage is the fastest responding dispatchable source of power on electric grids, and it is used to stabilise those grids, as battery storage can transition from standby to full power in under a second to deal with grid contingencies.

At full rated power, battery storage power stations are generally designed to output for up to a few hours. Battery storage can be used for short-term peak power and ancillary services, such as providing operating reserve and frequency control to minimize the chance of power outages. They are often installed at, or close to, other active or disused power stations and may share the same grid connection to reduce costs. Since battery storage plants require no deliveries of fuel, are compact compared to generating stations and have no chimneys or large cooling systems, they can be rapidly installed and placed if necessary within urban areas, close to customer load.

As of 2021, the power and capacity of the largest individual battery storage power plants is an order of magnitude less than that of the largest pumped storage power plants, the most common form of grid energy storage. For example, the Bath County Pumped Storage Station, the second largest in the world, can store 24GWh of electricity and dispatch 3GW while the first phase of Vistra Energy's Moss Landing Energy Storage Facility can store 1.2GWh and dispatch 300MW. Grid batteries do not however have to be large, and smaller ones can be deployed widely across a grid for greater redundancy.

As of 2019, battery power storage is cheaper than open cycle gas turbine power for use up to two hours, and there was around 365 GWh of battery storage deployed worldwide, growing extremely rapidly. Levelized cost of electricity from battery storage has fallen rapidly, halving in two years to US$150 per MWh as of 2020.

Construction 

Battery storage power plants and uninterruptible power supplies (UPS) are comparable in technology and function. However, battery storage power plants are larger.

For safety and security, the actual batteries are housed in their own structures, like warehouses or containers. As with a UPS, one concern is that electrochemical energy is stored or emitted in the form of direct current (DC), while electric power networks are usually operated with alternating current (AC). For this reason, additional inverters are needed to connect the battery storage power plants to the high voltage network. This kind of power electronics include GTO thyristors, commonly used in high-voltage direct current (HVDC) transmission.

Various accumulator systems may be used depending on the power-to-energy ratio, the expected lifetime and the costs. In the 1980s, lead-acid batteries were used for the first battery-storage power plants. During the next few decades, nickel–cadmium and sodium–sulfur batteries were increasingly used. Since 2010, more and more utility-scale battery storage plants rely on lithium-ion batteries, as a result of the fast decrease in the cost of this technology, caused by the electric automotive industry. Lithium-ion batteries are mainly used. A flow battery system has emerged, but lead-acid batteries are still used in small budget applications.

Safety 
Some batteries operating at high temperatures (sodium–sulfur battery) or using corrosive components are subject to calendar ageing, or failure even if not used. Other technologies suffer from cycle ageing, or deterioration caused by charge-discharge cycles. This deterioration is generally higher at high charging rates. These two types of aging cause a loss of performance (capacity or voltage decrease), overheating, and may eventually lead to critical failure (electrolyte leaks, fire, explosion).

Examples of the latter include a Tesla Megapack in Geelong which caught fire, the fire and subsequent explosion of a battery farm in Arizona, and the fire at Moss Landing battery farm. Concerns about possible fire and explosion of a battery module were also raised during residential protests against Cleve Hill solar farm in United Kingdom. Battery fire in Illinois resulted in "thousands of residents" being evacuated, and there were 23 battery farm fires in South Korea over the period of two years. Battery fires may release a number of dangerous gases, including  highly corrosive and toxic hydrogen fluoride.

Some batteries can be maintained to prevent loss of performance due to aging. For example, non-sealed lead-acid batteries produce hydrogen and oxygen from the aqueous electrolyte when overcharged. The water has to be refilled regularly to avoid damage to the battery; and, the inflammable gases have to be vented out to avoid explosion risks. However, this maintenance has a cost, and recent batteries such as Li-Ion, are designed to have a long lifespan without maintenance. Therefore, most of the current systems are composed of securely sealed battery packs, which are electronically monitored and replaced once their performance falls below a given threshold.

Sometimes battery storage power stations are built with flywheel storage power systems in order to conserve battery power. Flywheels may handle rapid fluctuations better than older battery plants.

Operating characteristics 
Since they do not have any mechanical parts, battery storage power plants offer extremely short control times and start times, as little as 10 ms. They can therefore help dampen the fast oscillations that occur when electrical power networks are operated close to their maximum capacity. These instabilities – voltage fluctuations with periods of as much as 30 seconds – can produce peak voltage swings of such amplitude that they can cause regional blackouts. A properly sized battery storage power plant can efficiently counteract these oscillations; therefore, applications are found primarily in those regions where electrical power systems are operated at full capacity, leading to a risk of instability. Batteries are also commonly used for peak shaving for periods of up to a few hours.

Battery storage systems may be active on spot markets while providing systems services such as frequency stabilization. Arbitrage is an attractive way to benefit from the operating characteristics of battery storages.

Storage plants can also be used in combination with an intermittent renewable energy source in stand-alone power systems.

Installation examples 

Some of the largest battery storage power plants are described below, and are arranged by type, date, and size.

Lithium-ion

United States 
In 2014, Southern California Edison commissioned the Tehachapi Energy Storage Project, which was the largest lithium-ion battery system operating in North America at the time of commissioning and one of the largest in the world.

In 2015, the largest grid storage batteries in the United States were reported to include the 31.5 MW battery at Grand Ridge Power plant in Illinois and the 31.5 MW battery at Beech Ridge, West Virginia, both using lithium ion batteries.

Tesla installed a grid storage facility for the Southern California Edison, with a capacity of 80 MWh at a power of 20 MW, between September 2016 and December 2016. As of 2017, the storage unit is one of the largest accumulator batteries on the market. Tesla installed 400 lithium-ion Powerpack-2 modules at the Mira Loma transformer station in California. The capacity serves to store energy at a low network load, and then feed this energy back into the grid at peak load. Before this, gas-fired power stations were used.

In 2017, Tesla built a 52 MWh lithium-ion project on Kauai, Hawaii, to entirely time-shift a 13 MW solar farm's output to the evening. The aim is to reduce dependence on fossil fuels on the island.

In 2019, National Grid built a 48 MWh battery storage facility on Nantucket Island.

In December 2020, Vistra Energy's Moss Landing Energy Storage Facility, on the site of the Moss Landing Power Plant, was connected to the grid.  At the time, the 300MW/1.2GWh facility was by far the largest in the world.
This project was backed by a 20-year resource adequacy contract with Pacific Gas & Electric (PG&E)

Australia 

In 2018, the largest battery storage power station was the Australian Hornsdale Power Reserve, adjacent to the Hornsdale wind farm, built by Tesla. Its 100 MW output capacity is contractually divided into two sections: 70 MW running for 10 minutes and 30 MW with a 3-hour capacity. Samsung 21–70-size cells are used. The system helps to prevent load-shedding blackouts and provides stability to the grid (grid services) while other slower generators can be started in the event of sudden drops in wind or other network issues. It was built in less than 100 days, starting from 29 September 2017, when a grid connection agreement was signed with ElectraNet, and some units were operational. The battery construction was completed, and testing began on 25 November 2017. It was connected to the grid on 1 December 2017. During two days in January 2018 where South Australia was hit by price spikes, the battery made its owners an estimated 1M AUD as they sold power from the battery to the grid for a price of around 14k AUD/MWh. In 2022, the Australian renewable energy development firm Edify Energy will receive $6.6 million in funding from the Australian Renewable Energy Agency (ARENA) to develop an advanced battery and inverter system capable of stabilising the electricity network.

Canada 
In Ontario, Canada, battery storage with 53 MWh capacity and 13 MW of power was put in service in 2016. The Swiss battery manufacturer Leclanché supplied the batteries, and Deltro Energy Inc. planned and built the plant. The order was placed by the network operator Independent Electricity System Operator (IESO). The energy storage is used to provide fast grid services, mainly for voltage and reactive power control. In Ontario and the surrounding area, there are many wind and solar power plants, whereby the power supply varies widely.

United Kingdom 
In July 2018, a 50 MW lithium-ion battery storage facility with a capacity of 50 MWh was installed in Stocking Pelham.

South Korea 
Since January 2016, in South Korea, three battery storage power plants are in operation. There are two new systems, a 24 MW system with 9 MWh and a 16 MW system with 6 MWh. These both use batteries based on lithium-nickel-manganese-cobalt oxide and supplement a few month's older system with 16 MW and 5 MWh whose batteries are based on lithium titanate oxide. Together the systems have a capacity of 56 MW and serve the South Korean utility company Korea Electric Power Corporation (KEPCO) for frequency regulation. The storage comes from the company Kokam. After completion in 2017, the system should have a power of 500 MW. The three already installed storage plants reduce annual fuel costs by an estimated $13 million US, as well as cutting greenhouse gas emissions. Thus, the saved fuel costs will exceed the cost of battery storage significantly.

Germany 
A 13 MWh battery made of worn lithium-ion batteries from electric cars is being constructed in Germany, with an expected second life of 10 years, after which they will be recycled.

In Schwerin, Germany, the electricity supplier WEMAG operates lithium-ion battery storage to compensate for short-term power fluctuations. Younicos supplied the battery storage power station. The South Korean company Samsung SDI supplied the lithium-ion cells. The storage has a capacity of 5 MWh and an output of 5 MW. It entered operation in September 2014. The lithium-ion battery storage consists of 25,600 lithium manganese cells, and has about five medium-voltage transformers, with both the regional distribution connected as well with the nearby 380 kV high-voltage grid.

Since July 2014, the energy storage company Nord GmbH & Co. KG has been operating some of the largest hybrid batteries in Europe in Braderup (Schleswig-Holstein, Germany). The system consists of a lithium-ion battery storage (2 MW power 2 MWh storage) and a vanadium flow battery storage (330 kW power, 1 MWh storage capacity). The lithium-ion modules used are from Sony, and the flow battery is made by Vanadis Power GmbH.
The storage system is connected to the local community wind park (18 MW installed capacity).

Portugal 
On the Azores island of Graciosa, a 3.2 MWh lithium-ion storage was installed. Along with a 1 MW photovoltaic plant and a 4.5 MW wind farm, the island is almost completely independent of the previously used diesel generators. The old power plant only serves as a backup system when power from solar and wind power plant can not be generated over a longer period, due to bad weather. The sharp decline of expensive diesel imports means that electricity is cheaper than before. The generated profit will be divided equally among the investor in the new plant and the end-users. More Azores islands are to follow.

Namibia
In December 2021, the German State-Owned Investment and Development Bank (KfW), granted Namibia Power Corporation (NamPower) €20 million, as partial funding (approx. 80 percent) towards the establishment of Erongo Battery Energy Storage System (Erongo Bess). The 58MW/72MWh installation is under development outside Omaruru in the Erongo Region, in central Namibia.

Liquid-based 
Mitsubishi installed a sodium–sulfur battery storage facility in Buzen, Fukuoka Prefecture in Japan with 300 MWh capacity and 50 MW power. The storage is used to stabilize the network to compensate for fluctuations caused by renewable energies. The accumulator is in the power range of pumped storage power plants. The batteries are installed in 252 containers. The plant occupies an area of 14,000 square meters.

A 108 MW / 648 MWh high-temperature sodium–sulfur battery was deployed as 15 systems in 10 locations in Abu Dhabi in 2019. The distributed systems can be controlled as one virtual power plant.

Lithium iron phosphate 
The Chinese company BYD operates battery banks with 40 MWh capacity and 20 MW maximum power in Hong Kong. The large storage is used to cushion load peaks in energy demand and can contribute to the frequency stabilization in the net. The battery is made up of a total of almost 60,000 individual lithium iron phosphate cells, each with 230 amp-hour capacity. The project was started in October 2013 and went online in June 2014. The actual installation of the storage lasted three months. The use of price differences between loading and unloading by day and night electricity, an avoided grid expansion for peak loads and revenue for grid services such as Frequency stabilization enable economic operation without subsidies. There are currently 3 locations for a 1,000 MW peak power to 200 MWh capacity storage power plant to be examined.

Lead–acid 
A 36 MW lead–acid battery was in Notrees, Texas (36 MW for 40 minutes). It was replaced with lithium-ion in 2017.

The existing photovoltaic power plant Alt Daber near Wittstock in Brandenburg, Germany received battery storage of 2 MWh. A special feature is that this is a turnkey solution supplied and installed in containers, for immediate use on-site without major construction work. The storage uses lead-acid batteries.

The Chino Battery Storage Project operated from 1988 to 1997 by the Southern California Edison in the Californian city Chino. It served primarily for grid stabilization and could be used by frequent power outages in the region as a static var compensator and the black start of non-black bootable power plants. The plant had a peak power of 14 MW, which was, however, far too little for effective stabilization in the net of Southern California Edison, and a storage capacity of 40 MWh. The system consisted of 8,256 lead-acid batteries in eight strands, which were divided into two halls.

Nickel–Cadmium

Golden Valley Electric – Fairbanks 
One of the largest and located with the Stand 2010 operating system is operated by the Golden Valley Electric in Fairbanks. The power grid in Alaska is operated due to the large distances as a stand-alone grid with no direct connection to neighboring North American interconnections within the North American Electric Reliability Corporation. The battery storage power plant with a maximum capacity of 25 MW is used to stabilize the grid for up to 15 minutes, covering high peak and reactive power compensation. The plant was put into operation in 2003 and consists of 13,760 nickel–cadmium batteries in four strands. The NiCd cells are manufactured by Saft, the inverters by ABB.

Lithium polymer

Battery storage Feldheim 
In Feldheim in Brandenburg, Germany, battery storage with a capacity of 10 MW and a storage capacity of 6.5 MWh  was put into operation in September 2015. The project cost 12.8 million euros. The storage provides energy for the power grid to compensate for fluctuations caused by wind and solar power plants. The store is operated by the company Energiequelle.

Battery storage Dresden 
Stadtwerke Dresden, Germany (Drewag) have taken battery storage with a peak power of 2 MW online on March 17, 2015. The costs amounted to 2.7 million euros. Lithium polymer batteries are being used. The batteries including the control system are deployed in two 13 m long containers and can store a total of 2.7 MWh. The system is designed to compensate for peak power generation of a nearby solar plant.

Projects

250–280 MW NV Energy and Google 
NV Energy has announced a partnership with Google to produce "the largest battery-backed solar corporate agreement in the world." Located in Nevada with 250–280 MW battery storage, the new project will power Google's Henderson data centre near Las Vegas.

400 MWh Southern California Edison project 
Under construction in 2015 is the 400 MWh (100 MW for 4 hours) Southern California Edison project. Developed by AES Energy it is a lithium-ion battery system. Southern California Edison found the prices for battery storage comparable with other electricity generators.

250 MWh Indonesia 
At present (2/2016) is under construction a 250 MWh battery storage in Indonesia. There are about 500 villages in Indonesia which should be supplied, so far they depend on the power supply of petroleum. In the past, the prices fluctuated greatly and there was often power outages. Now the power will be generated through wind and solar power.

United Kingdom 
In 2016, the UK National Grid issued contracts for 200 MW of energy storage in its Enhanced Frequency Response (EFR) auction. Within the auction, National Grid accepted eight tenders from seven providers including EDF Energy Renewables, Vattenfall, Low Carbon, E.ON UK, Element Power, RES and Belectric. The capacity for each successfully tendered site ranged from 10 MW to 49 MW.

In December 2019, Penso Power's Minety Battery Energy Storage Project started construction near Minety, Wiltshire. Chinese investment provided the finance and the China Huaneng Group was responsible for construction and operation. The designed capacity is 136 MWh, using LiFePO4 batteries. The main equipment of the project was manufactured and integrated by Chinese companies; more than 80% of equipment was made in China. It started operation in July 2021 and was reported to be the biggest storage battery facility in Europe. In 2020, Penso Power decided to expand the project to 266 MWh, to be completed in 2021.

In November 2022, the Pillswood 198 MWh battery storage system using Tesla Megapack lithium-ion batteries, capable of producing 98 MW for 2 hours, was commissioned adjacent to Creyke Beck substation near Cottingham for the Dogger Bank Wind Farm.

Evonik battery storage 
Evonik is planning to build six battery storage power plants with a capacity of 15 MW to be put into operation in 2016 and 2017. They are to be situated in North Rhine-Westphalia, Germany at the power plant sites Herne, Lünen and Duisburg-Walsum and in Bexbach, Fenne and Weiher in the Saarland.

Storage for Aboriginal community in Australia 
An existing system in an Aboriginal community in Australia consisting of a combination photovoltaic system and diesel generator will be extended by a lithium-ion battery to a hybrid system. The battery has a capacity of about 2 MWh and a power of 0.8 MW. The batteries store the excess solar power and take over the previously network-forming functions such as network management and network stabilization of diesel generators. Thus, the diesel generators can be switched off during the day, which leads to cost reduction. Moreover, the share of renewable energy rises in the hybrid system significantly. The system is part of a plan to transform the energy systems of indigenous communities in Australia.

China 
In 2022, China connected a battery farm consisting of 800 MWh redox flow batteries with vanadium electrolyte to the grid. With the ability to supply 200 MW of electricity for up to 4 hours, it is the largest battery farm of its kind in the world. The power station is located in the city of Dalian, and its first phase, half the capacity, entered commercial operation in May 2022.

Largest grid batteries

Planned or under construction

Market development and deployment
While the market for grid batteries is small compared to the other major form of grid storage, pumped hydroelectricity, it is growing very fast. For example, in the United States, the market for storage power plants in 2015 increased by 243% compared to 2014. The 2021 price of a 60MW / 240MWh (4-hour) battery installation in the United States was US$379/usable kWh, or US$292/nameplate kWh, a 13% drop from 2020.

In 2010, the United States had 59 MW of battery storage capacity from 7 battery power plants. This increased to 49 plants comprising 351 MW of capacity in 2015. In 2018, the capacity was 869 MW from 125 plants, capable of storing a maximum of 1,236 MWh of generated electricity. By the end of 2020, the battery storage capacity reached 1,756 MW. At the end of 2021, the capacity grew to 4,588 MW. In 2022, US capacity doubled to 9 GW / 25 GWh.

As of May 2021, 1.3 GW of battery storage was operating in the United Kingdom, with 16 GW of projects in the pipeline potentially deployable over the next few years. In 2022, UK capacity grew by 800 MWh, ending at 2.4 GW / 2.6 GWh.

In 2020, China added 1,557 MW to its battery storage capacity, while storage facilities for photovoltaics projects accounting for 27% of the capacity, to the total 3,269 MW of electrochemical energy storage capacity.

There is a lot of movement in the market, for example, some developers are building storage systems from old batteries of electric cars, where costs can probably be halved compared to conventional systems from new batteries.

See also 
 List of energy storage power plants

References 

Battery (electricity)
Power stations